Bloodletting & Miraculous Cures is a short story collection by Vincent Lam, published in 2006. The book, inspired by Lam's own experiences in medical school and as a professional physician, is a volume of interconnected short stories about the lives and relationships of Fitzgerald, Ming, Chen and Sri, four young medical students in Toronto.

Bloodletting won the 2006 Scotiabank Giller Prize.

The book was adapted as the Canadian TV series of the same name, which ran for one season in 2010 on The Movie Network and HBO Canada.

References

2006 short story collections
Canadian short story collections
Scotiabank Giller Prize-winning works
Doubleday (publisher) books
Asian-Canadian literature